GGM may refer to:

 Global Geoid Model
 Global Geo-potential Model
 Gabriel García Márquez (1927–2014), Colombian author
 Generic group model
 Goodness Gracious Me (disambiguation)
 Gordon growth model
 Grindelwald–Männlichen gondola cableway, in Switzerland
 Guru Kalyan, Indian film music composer
 Kakamega Airport, in Kenya
Gwangju Global Motors, automobile manufacturing plant located in South Korea